Christina Kishimoto is an American education administrator. She served as superintendent of the Hawai'i Department of Education starting in 2017 through the end of her contract in 2021 and in Hartford, Connecticut; and superintendent of Gilbert Public Schools.

Biography
Christina Kishimoto was born in the Bronx in New York. She has four siblings. Kishimoto was inspired to pursue a career in public education by her childhood teachers. Kishimoto was part of the A Better Chance program, which she moved from the Bronx to attend school in Wellesley, Massachusetts, as a sophomore. She'd eventually attend Barnard College and earn her PhD from Columbia University Teachers College in education administration.

Kishimoto is the former superintendent and chief executive officer of Gilbert Public Schools in Gilbert, Arizona. She is also former superintendent of Hartford, Connecticut.

Kishimoto became superintendent of the Hawai'i Department of Education in August 2017 with a salary of $240,000. In early March 2021, she has announced that she'll be stepping down as the superintendent due to poor job performance during the COVID-19 pandemic.

Kishimoto is married and has one daughter and lives in the Ala Moana neighborhood of Honolulu, Hawaii.

References

Living people
Barnard College alumni
Teachers College, Columbia University alumni
People from Honolulu
People from the Bronx
State superintendents of public instruction of the United States
Women academic administrators
Year of birth missing (living people)
School superintendents in Arizona
School superintendents in Hawaii